Gary Dickson Gray (December 18, 1936 – April 4, 2006) was an American child actor in films, and as an adult in television.

Biography
Born in Los Angeles, California, Gray was the son of Jeanie Ellen Dickson and John William Gray, aka Bill Gray, a film business manager. On January 28, 1961 he married Jean Charlene Bean. The couple had four daughters and 19 grandchildren.

Acting career
[[File:Gary Gray-Chief Yowlachie in The Painted Hills.jpg|thumb|Gray (left) with Chief Yowlachie in a promotional poster for the 1951 film The Painted Hills]]
It was two clients of his father's, Bert Wheeler and Jack Benny, who suggested that Gray should be used in films. Gray made his film debut in the Joan Crawford film A Woman's Face in 1941, and played minor roles in such popular films as Heaven Can Wait (1943), Gaslight (1944) and Meet Me in St. Louis (1944). In the 1944 short feature I Am an American he played Thomas Jefferson Kanowski, son of fictional Polish immigrant Fydor Kanowski. He played more substantial roles in films such as Return of the Bad Men (1948) with Randolph Scott, Gun Smugglers (1948) with Tim Holt, Rachel and the Stranger (also 1948) with Robert Mitchum, The Next Voice You Hear (1950) with Nancy Reagan and James Whitmore, and Wild Heritage (1958) with Maureen O'Sullivan.

On April 17, 1956, Gray was cast as sixteen-year-old Jackie Jensen, later a Major League Baseball player, in "The Jackie Jensen Story", which aired on the NBC anthology series, Cavalcade of America. Jensen played himself as an adult; Vivi Janiss was cast as Jensen's mother.

By the time he graduated from high school Gray had appeared in more than 70 films, however as an adult his acting roles were fairly few, and were mainly for television. By the early 1960s, he had retired from acting and concentrated on raising his family.

Business career and later life

In 1960, Gray started a swimming pool maintenance and repair business. For the last 25 years of his 38 years in the swimming pool industry, Gray worked for two of the major international manufacturers of swimming pool equipment as territory, regional, and national sales manager. Gray was a sought-after speaker and educator for the "National Spa and Pool Institute" as well as by the "Independent Pool and Spa Service Association". Gray retired from the swimming pool industry in July, 1999.

Gray collected tapes of his movies and television programs, as well as stills, posters, and lobby cards from his acting career. Beginning in the mid-90s, he was a frequent guest at film festivals throughout the United States. He enjoyed visiting with his fans, and relating many interesting stories from his lengthy career. Gray played golf as a hobby.

Personal life
Gary Gray was married to Jean Charlene Bean and had 4 children.

Death 
Gary Gray died on April 4, 2006, in Brush Prairie, Washington from cancer, aged 69.

Filmography

References

 Bibliography 

 Holmstrom, John (1996). The Moving Picture Boy: An International Encyclopaedia from 1895 to 1995''. Norwich: Michael Russell, p. 199-200.

External links
 
 

20th-century American businesspeople
American male film actors
American male television actors
American male child actors
Male actors from Los Angeles
1936 births
2006 deaths
Deaths from cancer in Washington (state)
Burials at Forest Lawn Memorial Park (Glendale)
20th-century American male actors